Catherine Anna Kelly MLA (born 27 June 1987) is a Sinn Féin politician from Loughmacrory, County Tyrone, who served as Member of the Legislative Assembly for the West Tyrone constituency in the Northern Ireland Assembly June 2017 until her resignation in October 2020.

Education
Kelly studied English and History at Liverpool John Moores University and Early Childhood Studies at South West College in Omagh.

Nursery school teacher 
She also worked at an Irish language nursery school.

Sinn  Féin and political career 
Kelly joined Sinn Féin in 2009 and stood as a candidate in the local elections in Omagh Town in 2014. She worked as an advisor to Barry McElduff. After the 2017 general election, she was co-opted to the Northern Ireland Assembly to represent the West Tyrone constituency following McElduff's election to the House of Commons. Kelly resigned on 31 October 2020 following controversy over a small-business grant related to the COVID-19 epidemic. She was replaced on the assembly by Nicola Brogan.

Harassment complaint 
In 2017 Kelly was the subject of a complaint of harassment made by a minister in the Republic relating to articles and social media posts Kelly had published online.

References

External links

1987 births
Living people
Sinn Féin MLAs
Northern Ireland MLAs 2017–2022
Female members of the Northern Ireland Assembly
Politicians from County Tyrone